Maarten Herman van Gent (born 22 March 1947 in Rotterdam, Netherlands) is a Dutch basketball coach, manager, scout and businessman.

Van Gent started playing basketball at age 17. He also played korfball and soccer in college. After serving in the Royal Netherlands Army in 1968, he became a physical education teacher. In 1970 at age 23, van Gent started coaching basketball teams. The first team was AMVJ Rotterdam. After five years with the team, he started coaching Frisol Rowic in Dordrecht. In 1982, he won the Dutch Championship with Nationale Nederlanden Donar. From 1984 to 1990, van Gent coached in Belgium and won the Belgian Championship in 1985 with Sunair Oostende. He quit coaching in 1991 after he was fired from Houthalen basketball team.

In 1992, he moved to Estonia and started working as a basketball agent for Globe Sports Management in Europe. In 1996, he started coaching again, this time in Estonia. He won the Estonian Championship in 1996 with Tallinna Kalev. From 1997 to 1999, he was also the coach of the Estonia national basketball team. From 2000 to 2004 he coached Ehitustööriist and the Netherlands national basketball team. In 2005, he again quit coaching and concentrated on business and managing. He also worked for three years as a scout for the NBA team the New York Knicks.

Van Gent returned to coaching in the 2008–2009 season at Rotterdam and again in the 2009–2010 season at EiffelTowers in Den Bosch after both teams fired their previous coaches during the season.

Maarten van Gent owns a real estate company named "Vangent Holding OU".

References

External links
Globe Sports Management Inc.

1947 births
Living people
Dutch basketball coaches
Dutch businesspeople
Dutch expatriate basketball people in Estonia
Sportspeople from Rotterdam
BC Kalev/Cramo coaches
Donar (basketball club) coaches
BC Oostende coaches
Feyenoord Basketball coaches
Heroes Den Bosch coaches
BS Weert coaches
Dutch expatriate basketball people in Belgium
Basketball scouts
Dutch sports agents
Estonia national basketball team coaches